WLAB (88.3 MHz) is a non-commercial, listener-supported FM radio station in Fort Wayne, Indiana.  It is owned by the Star Educational Media Network and broadcasts a Contemporary Christian radio format.  It holds periodic on-air fundraisers to support the broadcasts.

WLAB has an effective radiated power (ERP) of 7,500 watts.  In addition to its main transmitter at 88.3, it has FM translators in Kendallville (89.7 MHz), Auburn (99.9 MHz) and Warsaw (90.9 MHz). The station also simulcasts its programming on 91.3 FM WCKZ in Orland, Indiana, which expands the station's coverage area to include Angola and LaGrange, Indiana, and in Michigan, into Coldwater and Sturgis.

History
It was owned by the Indiana District of the Lutheran Church–Missouri Synod for 23 years until 2009, when it was sold to Star Educational Media Network. The station is still located on the campus of Concordia Theological Seminary, an LCMS seminary.

Also in 2009, STAR 88.3 was awarded Station of the Year (Small Market) by the Gospel Music Association as well as the Rob Gregory Award for Community Service in Ft. Wayne.

Programming 
"Conversations", with Melissa Montana, airs Monday through Friday at 12:20 pm. Topics of conversation are directed toward mothers and generally include tips on marriage and parenting.  Local events are also discussed.

"Keep The Faith" is a Sunday programming block featured on several radio stations. It is branded all-day Sunday, and features live talks at 7:00 am and 7:00 pm. STAR 88.3 DJ Don Buettner is the Associate Producer

The morning show features STAR DJs Brant and Sherri.

References

External links
 Star 88.3 WLAB

LAB
Lutheran Church–Missouri Synod
Radio stations established in 1976
1976 establishments in Indiana
LAB